The Philippine Touring Car Championships (PTCC), formerly the Philippine National Touring Car Championships, is the only touring car series running under the banner of the Automobile Association of the Philippines (AAP).

Race Fans Incorporated, a private enterprise, has undertaken organizing, promotion, and marketing activities of this event after being granted exclusive permission in a memorandum of agreement with the AAP.

PTCC races run both at the Subic International Raceway (owned and operated by Philippine racing legend Pocholo Ramirez) and the Batangas Racing Circuit (owned and operated by Johnny Tan).

Touring car races in the Philippines has not yet reached the levels of popularity enjoyed by other motoring sports such as karting, drag racing and open wheel racing.  However, the growing number of entries in the PTCC grid has grown from 24 cars in its 2005 season to 34 cars in its 2006 season. 

The Philippine Touring Car Championships (PTCC), formerly the Philippine National Touring Car Championships, is the only touring car series running under the banner of the Automobile Association of the Philippines (AAP).

Race Fans Incorporated, a private enterprise, has undertaken organizing, promoting, and marketing activities of this event after being granted exclusive permission in a memorandum of agreement with the AAP.

References

External links
 AAP Webpage
 2010 Report
 2005,2006,2007 reports

Motorsport in the Philippines
Touring car racing series